The 1986–87 Penn Quakers men's basketball team represented the University of Pennsylvania during the 1986–87 NCAA Division I men's basketball season. The Quakers, led by 2nd-year head coach Tom Schneider, played their home games at The Palestra as members of the Ivy League. They finished the season 13–14, 10–4 in Ivy League play to win the conference championship. They received the Ivy League's automatic bid to the NCAA tournament where they lost in the First Round to No. 1 seed North Carolina.

Roster

Schedule and results

|-
!colspan=9 style=| Non-conference regular season

|-
!colspan=9 style=| Ivy League regular season

|-
!colspan=9 style=| NCAA Tournament

Awards and honors
Perry Bromwell – Ivy League Player of the Year

References

Penn Quakers men's basketball seasons
Penn
Penn
Penn
Penn